Dhawan or Dhowan or Dhown or  Duhan is a surname based on the name of a clan of the Khatri community, found in Northern India.

It is popularly believed to mean "runner" or "messenger" which is derived from the Sanskrit word "dhav" (to run). As per historian R.C. Dogra, Dhawan translates to "messager of the battlefield". Before 1947, they were found in the districts of Lahore, Jhang, Lyallpur, Shahpur etc

Notable people
Notable people who bear the name, although they may not necessarily be connected to the caste group, include:
 Satish Dhawan,Indian Aerospace engineer and Rocket Scientist
 Anil Dhawan, an Indian actor
 Ashish Dhawan, is an Indian private equity investor and philanthropist
 Ashita Dhawan, is an Indian television actress
 David Dhawan, an Indian film director
 Deepak Dhawan, Communist Activist of Punjab
 Harmohan Dhawan, is an Indian politician and Former Member of Parliament 
 Jyotsna Dhawan, is an Indian Indian Cell and Developmental Biologist
 Prem Dhawan, an Indian lyricist
 Rishi Dhawan, an Indian cricketer 
 Robin Dhowan, 22nd Indian Navy Chief 
 R. K. Dhawan, an Indian politician
 Rohit Dhawan, an Indian film director
 Sabrina Dhawan, an England-born Indian screenwriter
 Sacha Dhawan, an English actor
 Shikhar Dhawan, an Indian international cricketer
 Varun Dhawan, an Indian film actor

References

Khatri clans
Punjabi tribes
Indian surnames
Surnames of Indian origin
Punjabi-language surnames
Hindu surnames
Khatri surnames